Madanapalle revenue division is an administrative division in the Annamayya district of the Indian state of Andhra Pradesh. It is the largest and one of the 3 revenue divisions in the district with 11 mandals under its administration. Madanapalle serves as the headquarters of the division. The division has only one Municipal Corporation in Madanapalle. Administered by IAS cadre officer as SUB collector.

Administration 
The details of the mandals and urban settlements in the division are:

History

The revenue division was originally a part of Chittoor district and was made part of the newly formed Annamayya district on 4 April 2022.

See also 
List of revenue divisions in Andhra Pradesh
List of mandals in Andhra Pradesh

References 

Revenue divisions in Andhra Pradesh